Thermolongibacillus altinsuensis is a Gram-positive, aerobic, endospore-forming and motile bacterium from the genus of Thermolongibacillus which has been isolated from sediments from the Altinsu hot spring in Nevşehir, Turkey.

References

 

Bacillaceae
Bacteria described in 2014